State Road 329 (NM 329) is a  state highway in the US state of New Mexico. NM 329's southern terminus is at Interstate 25 Business (I-25 Bus.) in Las Vegas, and the northern terminus is a continuation as Mills Avenue at NM 65 in Las Vegas.

History
The Mills Avenue portion of NM 329, from the junction of NM 65 (Hot Springs Boulevard) eastward to the junction of I-25 Bus., was transferred to the City of Las Vegas in a road exchange agreement dated August 11, 1992.

Major intersections

See also

References

329
Transportation in San Miguel County, New Mexico
Las Vegas, New Mexico